Denmark at the UCI Road World Championships is an overview of the Danish results at the UCI Road World Championships. The Danish competitors are selected by coaches of the Danish Cycling Federation. Denmark was one of the founding nations of the World Championships, and were the hosts of the first edition ever, the 1921 UCI Road World Championships in Copenhagen. This event only consisted of one race, the men's amateur road race, in which the Danes also won their first ever medal at the World Championships, a silver medal for Willum Nielsen. Since then, Denmark has won a total of 53 medals at the World Championships, including 18 gold medals. Many of these have been won at home soil in Copenhagen, where six editions of the World Championships have been held (1921, 1931, 1937, 1949, 1956 and 2011).

List of medalists

This a list of all Danish medals (including elite, amateur, under-23 and junior races).

Medals by discipline
Updated following 2021 UCI Road World Championships

References

Nations at the UCI Road World Championships
Denmark at cycling events